Kathy Hite-James (born September 8, 1948) is an American professional golfer who played on the LPGA Tour.

Hite won once on the LPGA Tour in 1981.

Hite-James was inducted into the South Carolina Golf Hall of Fame in 2000 and the Winthrop Athletics Hall of Fame in 2007. She now lives in Palm Desert, California.

Professional wins

LPGA Tour wins (1)

References

External links

American female golfers
LPGA Tour golfers
ALPG Tour golfers
Golfers from South Carolina
Golfers from California
Winthrop University alumni
Sportspeople from Florence, South Carolina
People from Palm Desert, California
1948 births
Living people
21st-century American women